The Croatian Medical Journal (abbreviated CMJ) is a bimonthly peer-reviewed diamond open access general medical journal. It was established in 1953 as the Acta Facultatis Medicae Zagrabiensis, obtaining its current name in 1992. Its first issue under its current title was published in February 1992, and it has been published by Medicinska naklada since 2001. It was previously published by the University of Zagreb School of Medicine. The editor-in-chief is Tomislav Smoljanović (University of Zagreb School of Medicine). According to the Journal Citation Reports, the journal has a 2016 impact factor of 1.619.

References

External links

Publications established in 1953
General medical journals
Open access journals
Bimonthly journals
English-language journals
1953 establishments in Croatia
Academic journals of Croatia